Western Cove may refer to

Western Cove, Newfoundland and Labrador, a community in Canada
Western Cove, a body of water in Nepean Bay, South Australia